Government Doon Medical College is a full-fledged tertiary Government Medical college and hospital. It is located at Dehradun in Uttarakhand. The college imparts the degree of Bachelor of Medicine and Surgery (MBBS). The yearly undergraduate student intake is 175.

Courses
Government Doon Medical College undertakes the education and training of 175 students in MBBS courses. It also recently started postgraduate medical courses.

Affiliated
The college is affiliated with Hemwati Nandan Bahuguna Uttarakhand Medical Education University and is recognized by the National Medical Commission.

References

Medical colleges in Uttarakhand
Educational institutions established in 2016